Cory E. Vanthuyne is a Canadian politician, who was elected to the Legislative Assembly of the Northwest Territories in the 2015 election. He represented the electoral district of Yellowknife North  until the 2019 election, when he was defeated by Rylund Johnson.

Prior to his election to the legislature, Vanthuyne served two terms on Yellowknife City Council.

Vanthuyne is also a curler. He won the Northwest Territories Men's Curling Championship in 2012 playing second for the Steve Moss rink.

References

Canadian sportsperson-politicians
Living people
Members of the Legislative Assembly of the Northwest Territories
Sportspeople from Yellowknife
Yellowknife city councillors
Curlers from the Northwest Territories
21st-century Canadian politicians
1970 births